Tony DeLap (November 4, 1927 – May 29, 2019) was a West Coast artist, known for his abstract sculpture utilizing illusionist techniques and meticulous craftsmanship.  As a pioneer of West Coast minimalism and Op Art, DeLap's oeuvre is a testament to his willingness to continuously challenge the viewer's perception of reality.

Early career
Born in 1927 in Oakland, DeLap grew up in the Bay Area and studied art, illustration, and graphic design at several Bay Area colleges, including the San Francisco Academy of Art, and he also attended the Claremont Colleges in Southern California. He returned to the Bay Area, where he taught at the California College of Arts and Crafts, the San Francisco Art Institute and at UC Davis until he secured a teaching position at the newly founded campus of the University of California, Irvine. Bruce Nauman, James Turrell and John McCracken studied with DeLap.

Along with artists such as Ellsworth Kelly, DeLap followed a path of Geometric abstraction and Minimal art embracing the principles of limited color, geometry, precise craftsmanship, and intellectual rigor. Since the early 1960s, he was associated with an emerging movement of West Coast minimalism referred to as "finish fetish," along with several other artists including Craig Kauffman, Larry Bell, and DeWain Valentine.

Career
DeLap's work has been widely exhibited both nationally and internationally. Along with numerous solo exhibitions, DeLap was included in several important group exhibitions of the 1960s including; Primary Structures at the Jewish Museum; American Sculpture of the Sixties at the Los Angeles County Museum of Art; and The Responsive Eye at The Museum of Modern Art, New York City. He died on May 29, 2019 at the age of 91.

Collections
DeLap's work is in many private and public collections, including the San Jose Museum of Art; the Los Angeles County Museum of Art; the Museum of Contemporary Art, San Diego; the San Francisco Museum of Modern Art; the Whitney Museum of American Art; The Museum of Modern Art; the Solomon R. Guggenheim Museum, New York; the Walker Art Center in Minneapolis; and The Tate Gallery, London, among others.

References

External links
Interview of Delap, part of Los Angeles Art Community - Group Portrait interview series, Center for Oral History Research, UCLA Library Special Collections, University of California, Los Angeles.

American abstract artists
1927 births
2019 deaths
Sculptors from California
Artists from Oakland, California
People from Newport Beach, California
20th-century American sculptors
American male sculptors
20th-century American male artists